Holospondyli is a proposed clade of lepospondyl amphibians from the Early Carboniferous to the Late Permian that includes the aistopods, the paraphyletic nectrideans, and possibly also Adelospondyli. However, aistopods have since been recovered as stem-tetrapods more primitive than temospondyls or other groups of lepospondyls.

References

Reptiliomorphs
Lepospondyli